Hazen is both a surname and a given name. Notable people with the name include:

Surname:
Allen Hazen, American engineer
Chester Hazen, American businessman and politician
John Douglas Hazen (1860–1937), Canadian politician
Lee Hazen (1905-1991), American bridge player
Mick Hazen, As the World Turns actor
Mike Hazen, Executive vice-president and general manager of the Arizona Diamondbacks of MLB
Moses Hazen (1733–1802), American general
Robert Leonard Hazen (1808–1874), Canadian politician
Robert M. Hazen, Carnegie Institution for Science, Geophysical Laboratory
Tracy Elliot Hazen (1874–1943), American phycologist
William Babcock Hazen (1830–1887), American general

Given name:
Hazen Argue (1921–1991), Canadian politician
Hazen "Kiki" Cuyler (1898-1950), Major League Baseball player
Hazen S. Pingree (1840–1901), Detroit mayor and Michigan governor

See also

 Marcella Hazan